Gresham is a city located in Multnomah County, Oregon, in the United States of America, immediately east of Portland, Oregon. It is considered a suburb within the Greater Portland Metropolitan area. Though it began as a settlement in the mid-1800s, it was not officially incorporated as a city until 1905; it was named after Walter Quintin Gresham, the American Civil War general and United States Secretary of State.

The city's early economy was sustained largely by farming, and by the mid-20th century the city experienced a population boom, growing from 4,000 residents to over 10,000 between 1960 and 1970. The population was 114,247 at the 2020 census, making Gresham the fourth largest city in Oregon.

History

The area now known as Gresham was first settled in 1851 by brothers Jackson and James Powell, who claimed land under the Donation Land Claim Act of 1850. They were soon joined by other pioneer families, and the area came to be known as Powell's Valley. In 1884, a local merchant petitioned the United States Post Office Department for a post office in his store, and offered to name it after Postmaster General Walter Q. Gresham if his request was granted. At the same time, other members of the community secured a post office called "Campground", another name for the area, referencing the religious camp meeting ground located there and the valley's usefulness as a stop-off for travelers on their way to Portland. Once the Post Office Department realized its mistake, it revoked the Campground post office.

Gresham was incorporated in 1905, the year of the Lewis and Clark Centennial Exposition; its population at the time was 365. Lewis Shattuck, son of a pioneer family, was the first mayor. The town's economy was fueled largely by farming, including berries, grapes, and vegetables. At the time, trains ran between Gresham and Portland on an hourly basis. Gresham's early settlers would go on to form the outlying communities of Boring, Sandy, Fairview, and Estacada.

Gresham's city library, which began as a small book collection in the town's general store, was officially established as the Gresham Branch Public Library in 1913 with a grant from the Andrew Carnegie library fund.

Gresham General Hospital opened in 1959 in downtown Gresham. In 1984, the hospital moved to Stark Street and became Mount Hood Medical Center.

In August 2016, the town was the place of the racially motivated murder of Larnell Bruce.

Geography

The total area includes parts of Fairview Creek and Johnson Creek.

Topography
Gresham's north and south borders are divided along U.S. Route 26, also known as the Mount Hood Highway, which begins on its western border along Powell Boulevard, then continues on Burnside Street before returning to the Mount Hood Highway in east Gresham.

Though much of Gresham is relatively flat, it is characterized by a hill on its eastern border. Northeast Gresham is also hilly, particularly where the city meets Troutdale toward the Columbia River. Johnson Creek, which begins at the foothills of the Cascade Mountains, runs westward through Gresham, with 23 percent of the creek's watershed running through the city.

Climate
Gresham, like most of western Oregon, has a Mediterranean climate (Köppen Csb/Csa). Summers feature pleasant mornings, very warm and sunny afternoons and only very occasional rainfall, whereas winters are cloudy with cool to cold afternoons, occasional frosts, and frequent long rainy periods.

Demographics

2000 census
As of 2000 the median income for a household in the city was $43,442, and the mean income for a family was $51,126. Males had a median income of $37,701 versus $27,744 for females. That is a difference of $9,957. The per capita income for the city was $19,588. About 8.4% of families and 12.5% of the population were below the poverty line, including 17.2% of those under the age of 18 and 6.7% of those 65 and older.

2005-2007 American Community Survey Estimates
83.9% - White (71.1 non-Hispanic White)
18.3% - Hispanic or Latino (of any race)
5.1% - Asian
5.1% - Some other race
4.7% - American Indian or Alaska Native
3.7% - African American or Black
0.3% - Native Hawaiian and Other Pacific Islander

2010 census
As of the census of 2010, there were 105,594 people, 38,704 households, and 25,835 families residing in the city. The racial makeup of the city was 76.0% White, 3.5% African American, 1.3% Native American, 4.3% Asian, 0.7% Pacific Islander, 9.8% from other races, and 4.5% from two or more races. Hispanic or Latino of any race were 18.9% of the population.

There were 38,704 households, of which 36.9% had children under the age of 18 living with them, 46.6% were married couples living together, 14.3% had a female householder with no husband present, 5.9% had a male householder with no wife present, and 33.2% were non-families. 25.2% of all households were made up of individuals, and 8.8% had someone living alone who was 65 years of age or older. The average household size was 2.69 and the average family size was 3.22.

The median age in the city was 33.6 years. 26.4% of residents were under the age of 18; 10.2% were between the ages of 18 and 24; 28.1% were from 25 to 44; 24.5% were from 45 to 64; and 10.7% were 65 years of age or older. The gender makeup of the city was 49.0% male and 51.0% female.

Arts and culture

Historic sites

There are several National Register of Historic Places sites located in Gresham. The Louise Home Hospital and Residence Hall, is located in west Gresham, and serves as a social services facility. Other sites include: the Jacob Zimmerman House, a farmhouse built by German-American settlers in 1874; the Hamlin–Johnson House, a farmhouse built in 1888; the Emanuel and Christina Anderson House and William Gedamke House, both Victorian Queen Anne homes built circa 1900; the Gresham Carnegie Library, built in 1913; the Dr. Herbert H. Hughes House, built in 1922; the Charles and Fae Olson House, a modernist home built in 1946; and the David and Marianne Ott House, a ranch home built in 1952.

Parks and recreation
There are numerous parks in Gresham, such as Main City Park, located near downtown Gresham. Other parks include East Gresham Park, Pat Pfeifer Park, Red Sunset Park, and Clatsop Butte Park, an upland butte located south of Powell Butte, which lies between Portland and Gresham. Other public points of interest are the Arts Plaza and Gresham Pioneer Cemetery, established in 1859.

Bicycle/pedestrian trails
Springwater Corridor
40-Mile Loop
Gresham–Fairview Trail
Gresham Butte Saddle Trail
Kelly Creek Greenway Trail
Nadaka Loop Trail

Government
The City of Gresham operates under the council–manager form of government. The mayor and city council are elected to be the legislative and policy-making body for the city.

The council appoints a city manager who is responsible for the daily operations of the city. The city manager of Gresham is Nina Vetter, who was appointed to the position on May 3, 2021.

The city council consists of the mayor and six councilors, all of whom serve four-year terms. Elections are held in November of even-numbered years. In election years divisible by four, (e.g., 2000, 2004, 2008), three councilors are elected. In election years not divisible by four, (e.g., 1998, 2002, 2006), the other three councilors and the mayor are elected.

Education
Gresham is served by three school districts: Centennial, Gresham-Barlow, and Reynolds. High schools include Gresham High School, Sam Barlow High School, Centennial High School, and Reynolds High School. Private schools include Portland Adventist Elementary School, Eastside Christian School, and Morningstar Montessori school.

Mount Hood Community College is also located in Gresham, and is the only college located within the city limits. It offers associate degrees, as well as bachelor's programs through a partnership with Eastern Oregon University. According to the US Census, 27.16% of the Gresham residents had a bachelor's degree, while 9.93% had earned a master's degree or above.

Infrastructure

Transportation

Highways
Gresham is accessed from the west via Interstate 84 and via U.S. Route 26 from the east.

Mass transit

Gresham is serviced by TriMet's bus system and the MAX Light Rail Blue Line, which includes the following MAX stations:
East 162nd Avenue
East 172nd Avenue
East 181st Avenue
Rockwood/East 188th Avenue (serving the Rockwood neighborhood)
Ruby Junction/East 197th Avenue
Civic Drive
Gresham City Hall
Gresham Central Transit Center
Cleveland Avenue (the Blue Line's eastern terminus)

Gresham is also served by the fareless Sandy Area Metro shuttle bus to Sandy, Oregon.

Notable people 

Shannon Bex (b. 1980), member of Danity Kane
Brian Burres (b. 1981), Major League Baseball pitcher
Randy Couture (b. 1963), mixed martial arts fighter
Sam Crouser (b. 1991), Olympic athlete
Marco Farfan, professional soccer player
Nikki Fuller (b. 1968), professional female bodybuilder
Robert Garrigus (b. 1977), PGA Tour
Katie Harman (b. 1980), Miss America 2002
Jess Hartley (b. 1967), author, editor, and tabletop game designer
Fred Jones (b. 1979), National Basketball Association player
Fouad Kaady (January 8, 1978 – September 8, 2005), a resident who was shot to death by police after being injured in a car wreck
Robert S. Lucas, U.S. Coast Guard Rear Admiral
Ronald A. Marks, former CIA official
Khamphoui Sisavatdy, prime minister of the Gresham-headquartered Royal Lao Government in Exile
Stu Weber, Christian author

Sister cities
Gresham's sister cities are:
 Ebetsu, Japan (1977)
 Owerri, Nigeria (1991)
 Sokcho, South Korea (1985)

References

External links

City of Gresham official website
Entry for Gresham in the Oregon Blue Book

 
Cities in Oregon
Cities in Multnomah County, Oregon
Populated places established in 1884
Portland metropolitan area
1884 establishments in Oregon